Arlöv is the seat of Burlöv Municipality, Skåne County, Sweden. It is statistically not defined as a locality of its own, but forms part of the contiguous city of Malmö, 5 km northeast of downtown Malmö. Out of Malmö's 344,000 inhabitants, 11,000 live in Arlöv. However, in the 1950s, a public vote took place, deciding once and for all that Burlöv Municipality would never be a part of Malmö.

Overview
Arlöv is known for its sugar industry, Sockerbolaget AB (owned by the Danish company Danisco). The town was also the home of the AB Svenska Järnvägsverkstäderna (Swedish Railway Works) or ASJ, who in the 1970s also built several automobiles for SAAB, notably the Saab Sonett II and III. Arlöv Church dates from 1900 and is Neo-Gothic in style; it was built to accommodate the growing congregation.

Arlöv is mentioned in the song "Hanna från Arlöv" ("Hanna from Arlöv") by the 1970s Swedish band Nationalteatern. 

Notable people from Arlöv include rock artist Kal P. Dal, footballer Pontus Jansson, and author Amanda Svensson.

The former office building of Danisco Sugar was bought in 2008 by the Church of Scientology who opened their new church, a so-called "Ideal org" there in 2009.

References

Populated places in Burlöv Municipality
Populated places in Skåne County